Bimal Prasad Shrivastav is a Nepalese Politician and was Minister of Labour, Employment and Social Security of Government of Nepal since 4 June 2021 but was removed from the post by Supreme Court on 22 June 2021 making the tenure of just 18 days and shortest till date. He was also serving as the Member Of House Of Representatives (Nepal) elected from Parsa-2, Province No. 2. Previously he had lost Birjunj Mayoral election as a candidate. He is the member of the Presidium of Federal Socialist Forum.

References

Living people
Nepal MPs 2017–2022
Rastriya Janata Party Nepal politicians
People's Socialist Party, Nepal politicians
Loktantrik Samajwadi Party, Nepal politicians
1950 births